Spintherophyta violaceipennis is a species of leaf beetle native to North America. Its range spans from southern Arizona and California south to Mexico. The species can be identified by the color of the pronotum and elytra: the pronotum is shiny and has a dark blue color, while the elytra are dark coppery red to a deep purple. The species is reported to feed on oak, willow, juniper and pine. The specific name, violaceipennis, is derived from the Latin for "violet wings".

References

Further reading

 

Eumolpinae
Articles created by Qbugbot
Beetles described in 1892
Taxa named by George Henry Horn
Beetles of North America